Skrzynki may refer to the following places:
Skrzynki, Świecie County in Kuyavian-Pomeranian Voivodeship (north-central Poland)
Skrzynki, Włocławek County in Kuyavian-Pomeranian Voivodeship (north-central Poland)
Skrzynki, Łęczyca County in Łódź Voivodeship (central Poland)
Skrzynki, Tomaszów Mazowiecki County in Łódź Voivodeship (central Poland)
Skrzynki, Masovian Voivodeship (east-central Poland)
Skrzynki, Ostrzeszów County in Greater Poland Voivodeship (west-central Poland)
Skrzynki, Gmina Kórnik in Greater Poland Voivodeship (west-central Poland)
Skrzynki, Gmina Stęszew in Greater Poland Voivodeship (west-central Poland)